Alan Ernest Devonshire (born 13 April 1956) is an English former professional footballer who is the current manager of Maidenhead United. He was a wide midfielder who played for West Ham United, with whom he won the FA Cup in 1980, and Watford, where he finished his career in 1992. Devonshire won eight caps for England between 1980 and 1983. He subsequently became a manager with Maidenhead United, Hampton & Richmond Borough and Braintree Town.

Playing career

Early career
Born in Park Royal, then a part of Middlesex, Devonshire had been a schoolboy footballer but had been turned away by Crystal Palace at age 14 for being too small. He returned to Selhurst Park two years later and played a couple of youth team games but was again released by the club, this time by former West Ham player and Palace manager, Malcolm Allison. Devonshire started playing for non-league Southall and in doing so came to the attention of league clubs such as Reading, Southampton, and Brentford. By day he worked as a fork-lift truck driver at the Hoover Factory in Perivale, Middlesex. During this time he was spotted playing for Southall by West Ham United scouts, Eddie Baily and Charlie Faulkner who recommended him to West Ham manager, Ron Greenwood. Devonshire signed for West Ham United in 1976 for a fee of £5,000, a transfer which has led to him being referred to as "West Ham's best ever buy".

West Ham United
Devonshire made his debut for West Ham on 27 October 1976 in a League Cup tie against Queens Park Rangers, in which West Ham lost 2–0. He made his League debut three days later on 30 October 1976 against West Bromwich Albion, where he played in a 3–0 defeat. He soon became a fans' favourite, who referred to him by his nickname "Dev". His workman-like attitude was one to which the fans could relate. He also enhanced his rapport with supporters by travelling to home games on the London Underground from his West London home.

He played 29 games in all competitions, without scoring, in his first season, the 1976–77 season. It was a poor season for West Ham who finished only two points above a relegation place in 17th place in the First Division. The following season, the 1977–78 season saw Devonshire's first goals for the club, in a 3–3 at Upton Park on 12 November 1977. It also saw him play 38 games in all competitions, scoring three goals. Unfortunately for West Ham his efforts could not prevent them from relegation to the Second Division after they finished in 20th place. The 1978–79 season saw West Ham rebuilding their side following relegation. Devonshire was a regular member of the side which finished 5th in the Second Division. He had played 41 of a possible 42 league games that season and was voted Hammer of the Season. West Ham failed to gain promotion again in the 1979–80 season. They did however reach the 1980 FA Cup Final where Devonshire collected an FA Cup winner's medal as West Ham beat favourites, holders and Cup Winners Cup finalists Arsenal 1–0 at Wembley with a single goal from Trevor Brooking from a cross by Devonshire. He had also scored a goal in a semi-final replay at Elland Road in a 2–1 win against Everton. 

In the 1980–81 season Devonshire's career flourished. His partnership with Trevor Brooking formed the cornerstone of West Ham's push for promotion back to the First Division. He also played in European football for the first time and was a member of the side which reached the 1981 League Cup Final. He collected a Second Division title medal as they won promotion, losing only four games. Devonshire continued to be a regular member of the West Ham side in the First Division until a game on 7 January 1984. Playing against Wigan Athletic in the FA Cup, he snapped three ligaments in his right knee. He tried to make a comeback in March 1985 in two cup games against Wimbledon but again broke down. It was 19 months from his first injury to his full return, in a game against Birmingham City on 17 August 1985. His long spell out injured had resulted in him losing some of his pace but still maintaining his ability to pass the ball well. He made the final pass for many of the goals scored by teammates, Tony Cottee and Frank McAvennie in the 1985–86 season as West Ham finished third in the First Division.

Injury struck Devonshire again in the first game of the 1987–88 season. Just 15 minutes in a game against Queens Park Rangers, he snapped his Achilles tendon. This forced him out of the game for over a year and by the time of his return the West Ham team were in decline. The 1988–89 season saw him play only 20 league games without scoring as West Ham were relegated back to the Second Division. For the 1989–90 season manager John Lyall was replaced by Lou Macari who undertook the rebuilding of the West Ham side. Devonshire was rarely used making only seven league appearances that season. Macari was replaced in the same season by Billy Bonds who granted Devonshire a free transfer in May 1990. His last appearance for West Ham came on 14 February 1990 when he was a substitute for Gary Strodder in a 6–0 away defeat to Oldham Athletic in a League Cup semi-final. His performance, and that of other experienced West Ham players, Liam Brady, Phil Parkes, Alvin Martin and Julian Dicks, was described as "embarrassingly helpless" in a game known as the "St. Valentine's Day massacre".  Devonshire had played 448 competitive games over 14 years, scoring 32 goals.

Watford
In 1990 Devonshire signed for Watford, where he played for two years before dropping out of league football in 1992. He went on to serve non-league club Chippenham Sports as a player-coach.

International career
Devonshire was selected to play for England by his former manager at West Ham, Ron Greenwood. He made his debut on 20 May 1980 in a 1–1 draw against Northern Ireland. Greenwood selected him again on 31 May 1980 in a friendly game against Australia, which England won 2–1. Unfortunately for Devonshire his position and style of play were also those of Glenn Hoddle who was preferred as an international selection. He would have to wait two years for his next cap, on 25 May 1982 in a 2–0 win against Netherlands. Another game followed on 2 June 1982, a 1–1 draw against Iceland. Both of these games were warm-up games before the 1982 World Cup. Devonshire was omitted from the final squad for the tournament. New England manager, Bobby Robson attempting to rebuild an aging England team, selected Devonshire in October 1982. The game, against West Germany finished 2–1 to the Germans in a bad defeat for England. His final two appearances, against Greece and Luxembourg came towards the end of 1983 and were Devonshire's only appearances in competitive international games, the games being qualifiers for the 1984 UEFA European Football Championship.

Management career
Devonshire began his management career in charge of Brentford Women and the non-league club Osterley. He was appointed joint manager of Maidenhead United in the summer of 1996 alongside Martyn Busby, taking sole charge in March 1997. Under Devonshire, the Magpies ended a 27-year trophy drought by winning the Isthmian League Full Members Cup in 1996–97 and earned a historic promotion to the Isthmian League Premier Division after a third-place finish in 1999–00. The club also won four Berks & Bucks Senior Cups (1997–98, 1998–99, 2001–02, 2002–03). After the Chairman, Roger Coombs, announced his decision to step down at the end of the 2002–03 season, Devonshire followed suit. He then became the manager of Hampton & Richmond Borough in the Conference South, taking all of the Maidenhead squad with him, bar Brian Connor and Lawrence Yaku (who stayed at York Road) and Matty Glynn (who signed for St Albans City). He was inducted into the Maidenhead United Hall of Fame, alongside Connor, in January 2010.

As manager of Hampton & Richmond, he took the club from Isthmian League Division One South to the play-off-final of the Conference South. He guided them to fifth place in the Isthmian Division One South in his first season. Thanks to the re-organization of the non-league pyramid, that was enough to see the club promoted to the Isthmian League Premier Division. He then guided the club to a sixth-placed finish in their debut season at that level, missing out on the play-offs on goal difference on the final day. The 2005–06 season would see Devonshire take the team into the play-offs: having won a dramatic play-off semi-final on penalties away to Heybridge Swifts, the team then faced Fisher Athletic away, losing 3–0. Devonshire finally got Hampton & Richmond Borough promoted in style the following season, bringing the 2006–07 Isthmian Premier Division title to the Beveree. In their debut season in the Conference South, he guided his team to third place in the league and into the play-offs for the Conference National.

On 23 May 2011, Devonshire became manager of the newly promoted Conference National club Braintree Town. During his four-season spell at Cressing Road, Devonshire led the Iron to finishes of 12th, 9th, 6th, and 14th. Having declined a new contract, Devonshire left the club on 17 April 2015. 

Devonshire's second spell as Maidenhead United manager began in May 2015. On his return to United, his team brought Port Vale back to York Road for an FA Cup 1st Round replay in November 2015 after an unforgettable draw at Vale Park. A final league position of 7th in 2015–16 served notice of a tilt at promotion. After first topping the table in August, the Magpies held on to beat the challenge of Ebbsfleet United to win the 2016–17 title on the final day of the season, with Devonshire securing the National League South Manager of the Season award in the process. Maidenhead also won the Berks & Bucks Senior Cup in 2017 after beating Hungerford Town in the final at Slough. Devonshire then led the Magpies to a top-half finish in their inaugural National League season, winning the Manager of the Month award in April 2018. In June 2021, Devonshire signed a new three-year contract until the end of the 2023–24 season, which was a reward for keeping the part-time club safe from relegation at the top level of non-league football. The occasional scalps of big ex-league teams (particularly at York Road) have resulted in the use of the phrase 'You've been Devonshired'.

Career statistics

Managerial statistics

Personal life
Devonshire's father, Les, was a professional footballer with clubs including Chester City and Crystal Palace.

He has a race horse named after him.

References

Bibliography

1956 births
Living people
Footballers from Park Royal
English footballers
England B international footballers
England international footballers
Association football midfielders
Southall F.C. players
West Ham United F.C. players
Watford F.C. players
English Football League players
English football managers
Maidenhead United F.C. managers
Hampton & Richmond Borough F.C. managers
Braintree Town F.C. managers
National League (English football) managers
FA Cup Final players
Association football coaches